The 2010–11 TVL Premier League or 2010–11 Port Vila Premier League is the 17th season of the Port Vila Premier League top division.

The top five of the league qualify for the 2011 VFF National Super League.

Amicale FC were champions and Yatel FC relegated to the 2011–12 TVL First Division.

Teams 
 Amicale FC
 Ifira Black Bird
 Shepherds United
 Spirit 08
 Tafea FC
 Teouma Academy
 Tupuji Imere
 Yatel FC

Standings

References

External links
 

Port Vila Football League seasons
2010–11 in Vanuatuan football
Port
Port